Eupithecia demissa is a moth in the family Geometridae. It is found in Chile (Malleco Province).

The length of the forewings is about 7 mm. The ground colour of the forewings is white with a bright yellowish sheen. The ground colour of the hindwings is bright chalky white with obsolete transverse lines. Adults are on wing in February.

Etymology
The specific name is derived from demissus (meaning humble).

References

Moths described in 1994
demissa
Moths of South America
Endemic fauna of Chile